"Mimi on the Beach" is a song by the Canadian singer/songwriter Jane Siberry. It is the only single released in support of her second album No Borders Here, first issued in 1984.

Formats and track listing 
All songs written by Jane Siberry.
Canadian 7" single (DSR 91007)
"Mimi on the Beach" – 3:21
"Dancing Class" – 6:45

Netherlands 7" single (RR 5509)
"Mimi on the Beach" – 4:46
"Extra Executives" – 4:25

Canadian 12" single (DSR 12018)
"Mimi on the Beach" (extended version) – 7:35
"Mimi on the Beach" – 4:46
"You Don't Need" – 4:25

Charts

Personnel
Adapted from the Mimi on the Beach liner notes.

 Jane Siberry – vocals, guitar, keyboards, production
Musicians
 Al Cross – drums, percussion, LinnDrum
 Ken Myhr – guitar, percussion
 John Switzer – bass, percussion, production
 Doug Wilde – keyboards
 Rob Yale – Fairlight CMI

Production and additional personnel
 Mark Baldi – assistant engineering
 Kerry Crawford – production
 Jon Goldsmith – production, keyboards
 Bernie Grundman – mastering
 John Naslen – engineering
 Ron Seales – assistant engineering
 Rick Starks – assistant engineering
 France Tetreault – assistant engineering
 Jeff Wolpert – engineering

Release history

References

External links 
 

1984 songs
1984 singles
Jane Siberry songs
Song recordings produced by Jane Siberry
Songs written by Jane Siberry
Duke Street Records singles
Songs about beaches